Patricia Reznikov (born 1962 in Paris) is a Franco-American writer.

Biography 
Reznikov graduated from the École Nationale Supérieure des Beaux-Arts in Paris. From 1987 to 2000 she worked as an illustrator for the press, advertising and publishing (agency Illustrissimo from 1992 to 2002). At the same time she published her first texts. She is currently devoted exclusively to publishing. She is a novelist and a translator. She has been a reader of French and English texts for a large Parisian publishing house. She is also a juror of several prizes: the Prix Prométhée de la Nouvelle, the Prix Cabourg du Roman and the Prix Charles Oulmont of the Fondation de France.

Works

Fiction 
1994: Toro (novel) Ed. De l’Arsenal, (retenu pour l’opération “1er roman/ 1re dramatique” de France Culture, 1999
2001: Juste à la porte du jardin d’Eden (novel) Mercure de France, (selected for the Grand prix des lectrices de Elle)
2004: Mon teckel à roulettes est un philosophe (short story). ,  
2004: Vie et mort en magasin (short story). Ed. Du Rocher, 
2004: Dieu a égaré mon numéro de téléphone (novel) Mercure de France, (finalist of the Prix Cazes-Lipp, 2005).
2005: Un tour sur les montagnes russes (short story). Ed. Du Rocher, 
2007: Le Paon du Jour (novel) éditions du Rocher, (finalist of the Prix Valery Larbaud, Bourse Thyde Monnier 2007 of the Société des gens de lettres, Prix Charles Oulmont of the Foundation of France 2008).
2011: La Nuit n’éclaire pas tout (novel). Albin Michel 2011, (Prix Cazes-Lipp 2011).
2013: La Transcendante (novel). Albin Michel,  (selected by the prix Fémina, finalist of the prix Renaudot, Prix Révélation 2013 of the Forêt des Livres).

Essays 
2012: Hermann Hesse in Le Livre d'où je viens, 16 écrivains racontent. Éditions du Castor Astral
2014: I Colori di Massimo Arrighi (collective work), Campanotto Editore

Theatre 
1994: Toro ou le voyage en Espagne. Radiodrama for France Culture
 Femme de la Ville. "La Métaphore", revue du Théâtre National Lille Tourcoing. , March 1994.

Poetry 
 Ton monde est le mien, 39 contemporary poets, anthology. Ed. , October 2009.

Albums for youth
2003: La boîte de thé rouge (text and illustrations). Gallimard Jeunesse/ Amnesty International
2005: Le Chevalier des Rêves (text and illustrations). Ed. Du Rocher jeunesse
2006: La Véritable Nage Papillon (short story). “Va y avoir du sport”, collective work, Gallimard Jeunesse/ L'Écrit du Cœur
2007: Cerise Noire (text) illustrations by Laurent Corvaisier, Thomas Jeunesse/Amnesty International
2008: La Grande Invention d’Azule le Lutin (text and illustrations), Thomas Jeunesse
1997: L’Avenir, de Vincent Ravalec (illustrations) Éditions Michel Lagarde
2003: Le courage de la jeune Inuit,de J.Pasquet (illustrations) Albin Michel
2001: Contes et légendes des fées et des princesses (illustrations). 
2004: Contes et légendes des mille et une nuits (illustrations). Nathan
2004: Contes de chevaux, de R.Causse et N.Vézinet (illustrations). Albin Michel
2005: Écrire le Monde, la naissance des alphabets, by N.Cauwet (illustrations). Ed. Belem, (finalist of the prix jeunesse France Télévision 2006; finalist of the prix Sorcières 2007; Prix Octogones /Ricochet 2006).
2006: Compter le monde, la naissance des chiffres, by N.Cauwet (illustrations) Ed. Belem, (finalist of the prix Sorcières 2006)

Translations from English 
2006: La Soupe de Kafka, une histoire complète de la littérature mondiale en 16 recettes (Moules marinière à la Italo Calvino et Sole à la dieppoise à la Jorge Luis Borges), by Mark Crick. Flammarion
2008: La Baignoire de Goethe, bricoler avec les grands écrivains (Comment poser du papier peint avec Ernest Hemingway), by Mark Crick. Baker Street 
2011: Sisters Red by Jackson Pearce, Albin Michel
2014: Prières pour celles qui furent volées by Jennifer Clement, Flammarion, (finalist of the prix Fémina 2014, Prix des Lectrices de Elle/Lycéennes 2015)
2016: Retour à Ellinghurst by Clark Clark, Flammarion

External links 
 Patricia Reznikov - La Transcendante on YouTube
 Publications de Patricia Reznikov on CAIRN
 Patricia Reznikov on M.E.L
 Patricia Reznikov on Babelio
 Patricia Reznikov : « La création littéraire nous permet de transformer notre vécu » on L'internaute

21st-century French non-fiction writers
21st-century French essayists
French children's writers
French women children's writers
English–French translators
Writers from Paris
1962 births
Living people
21st-century French women writers
21st-century translators